Cirroctopus mawsoni is known from only one specimen, which was found in the waters off Adélie Land between 530 and 550 meters deep. It is the type species of genus Cirroctopus. C. mawsoni may be synonymous with Cirroctopus glacialis.

References

Octopuses
Species known from a single specimen
Marine fauna of Antarctica